The 2000–01 Columbus Blue Jackets season was the Blue Jackets' first season in the National Hockey League (NHL) after the city of Columbus, Ohio, was awarded an expansion team in 1997. The Blue Jackets finished 13th in the Conference and fifth in the Division. Thus, they were unable to qualify for the 2001 Stanley Cup playoffs.

Off-season
The team would be named the Blue Jackets, as it was chosen to celebrate "patriotism, pride and the rich Civil War history in the state of Ohio and the city of Columbus". The Jackets would join the Central Division in the Western Conference.

The club would name Doug MacLean as general manager. MacLean had previously been the head coach of the Florida Panthers, leading the team to the Stanley Cup Finals in 1996. MacLean hired Dave King as the head coach of the Jackets. King had previously been the head coach of the Calgary Flames from 1992 to 1995, and was an assistant on the Montreal Canadiens from 1997 to 1999.

On June 23, 2000, the Blue Jackets and their expansion cousins, the Minnesota Wild, participated in the 2000 NHL Expansion Draft in Calgary. Columbus selected goaltender Rick Tabaracci with their first pick. The following day on June 24, Columbus would participate in the 2000 NHL Entry Draft, and selected Rostislav Klesla with the fourth overall pick.

Regular season
On October 7, 2000, Columbus would play in their first game ever, losing 5–3 to the Chicago Blackhawks at Nationwide Arena. Bruce Gardiner scored the first goal in franchise history.  On October 14, the Blue Jackets became part of hockey history. In a loss against the Colorado Avalanche, goaltender Patrick Roy tied Terry Sawchuk for most career wins by a goaltender. The Blue Jackets would win their first ever game on October 12, defeating the Calgary Flames 3–2 at the Pengrowth Saddledome. Columbus would win its first home game on October 27, defeating the visiting Washington Capitals 3–1.

The Blue Jackets, like most expansion teams, would struggle throughout the season, and would finish the year 11 games under .500, with a 28–39–9–6 record, earning 71 points, 19 points behind the Vancouver Canucks for the final playoff spot in the Western Conference.

Geoff Sanderson would lead the Jackets with 30 goals and 56 points, while Espen Knutsen would lead Columbus with 44 assists. Steve Heinze was having a solid season, scoring 22 goals and 42 points, before being dealt to the Buffalo Sabres at the trade deadline. Jamie Heward led the blue line, scoring 11 goals and 27 points, while Deron Quint would score 7 goals and 23 points. Tyler Wright led the club with 140 penalty minutes.

Ron Tugnutt would get the majority of action in the Blue Jackets net, playing in 53 games, and tying a career high with 22 wins. Tugnutt would record a 2.44 goals against average (GAA), .917 save percentage and four shutouts. Marc Denis backed up Tugnutt, winning six games and recording a 3.25 GAA.

Season standings

Schedule and results

Green background indicates a win. 
Red background indicates a regulation loss. 
Yellow background indicates an overtime loss. 
White background indicates a tie.

Player statistics

Regular season
Scoring

Goaltending

Transactions

Trades

Draft picks
Columbus' draft picks at the 2000 NHL Entry Draft.

Expansion draft picks
Columbus' expansion draft picks at the 2000 NHL Expansion Draft.

References
SHRP Sports
The Internet Hockey Database
National Hockey League Guide & Record Book 2007

Columbus
Columbus Blue Jackets seasons
Col
Blue
Blue